Bear Rocks is an unincorporated community and census-designated place in Bullskin Township, Fayette County, Pennsylvania, United States. It is located along the south side of Pennsylvania Route 31 in northern Fayette County, on the western slope of Chestnut Ridge. As of the 2010 census, the population of the CDP was 1,048.

Demographics

References

External links

Census-designated places in Fayette County, Pennsylvania
Census-designated places in Pennsylvania